The Sittaung River (formerly, the Sittang or Sittoung) is a river in south central Myanmar in Bago Division. The Pegu Range separates its basin from that of the Irrawaddy. The river originates at the edge of the Shan Hills southeast of Mandalay, and flows southward to the Gulf of Martaban.

Basin
Although it flows through fairly flat country, the Sittaung has a notorious tidal bore at its mouth which has precluded any but very small craft navigating the river. The river is navigable for  year-round and for  during three months of the year. The Sittaung empties into the Gulf of Martaban where the tide-dominated coast is a Ramsar wetland of international importance.

The river is used primarily to float timber south for export. Strong currents make the river even less valuable as a means of transport in eastern Burma. Its basin does not have the same richness for agriculture as the Irrawaddy because there is no soil flowing down from the Shan Hills.

See also
 Battle of Sittang Bridge in 1942

References

External links
 Image of mouth on satellite

Rivers of Myanmar